Mohamed El-Amine Souef (born July 28, 1962) is a Comorian diplomat and former foreign minister, ambassador to Egypt, and Permanent Representative to the Arab League (1995–1998). He has been appointed deputy Foreign Minister in charge of the Arab World by president Mohamed Taki Abdulkarim in 1998. He first became foreign minister in 1999, following the military coup of Azali Assoumani. He resigned briefly in January 2002, along with Azali Assoumani, to make way for a transitional government, but he was reappointed a few months later when Assoumani won elections and regained power. He lost his post again in July 2005 during a cabinet reshuffle. After the reshuffle, Mr. Souef was named Ambassador and Permanent Representative of the Comoros to the United Nations in New York (April 2006). Previously, in government, He served as Parliamentarian, Minister of Foreign Affairs and Cooperation, State Minister in charge of Cooperation, Ambassador to Egypt and Permanent Representative to the Arab League States and, Adviser to the President of the Comoros.  Mr. Souef is currently serving DPKO after a long carrier within the Government of the Comoros.  

Souef was appointed on September 1 2022 as the Special Envoy of the African Union (AU) for Somalia and head the AU's Transition Mission in Somalia (ATMIS), replacing the Mozambican diplomat Francisco Madeira, who had held the office since 2015. Souef, a veteran diplomat, had prior to his appointment served as Head of the MINUSMA Office in Gao/Mali and held the same title in the UNAMID Liaison Office and in South and North Darfur (UNAMID) since April 2011. 

Souef is a scholar and an author of five books on politics and geopolitics. 
  (2008) 
  (2009)
  (2009)

References 
Books:

Souef Mohamed El-Amine, L'OUA : Réalisations et défaites, 1991
Souef Mohamed El-Amine, Djohar : Père de la démocratie, 1993
Souef Mohamed El-Amine, Mohamed Taki et le redressement national, 1996
Souef Mohamed El-Amine, Les Comores en mouvement, 2008
Souef Mohamed El-Amine, Les grands défis de la politique étrangère des Comores, 2009
Souef Mohamed El-Amine, Le transport aérien aux Comores entre sécurité et souveraineté, 2009;
Souef Mohamed El-Amine, Discours et Images des Comores ; 
Souef Mohamed El-Amine, Réflexions sur géopolitique de l’Océan indien Ed de laLune;

Magazines:
Albiithah,
Le Diplomate

1962 births
Living people
Foreign ministers of the Comoros
Comorian diplomats
Ambassadors of the Comoros to Egypt
Permanent Representatives of the Comoros to the United Nations
Government ministers of the Comoros